The West Coast League (WCL) is a collegiate summer baseball wooden bat league founded in 2005, comprising teams from Washington, Oregon, British Columbia and Alberta. The WCL was previously named the West Coast Collegiate Baseball League (WCCBL), but in 2008 renamed as the West Coast League. The league is designed to develop college talent, and only current college-eligible players are allowed to participate. The West Coast League has produced dozens of professional players, including a number of major leaguers. League teams are operated similarly to professional minor-league teams. The WCL's season typically runs from early June through the middle of August.

Current teams

Former teams

 
Aloha Knights: 2005–2006 (now Corvallis Knights)
Gresham GreyWolves: 2015–2017
Kitsap BlueJackets: 2005–2016 (now Port Angeles Lefties)
Klamath Falls Gems: 2011–2015

Medford Rogues: 2013–2015
Moses Lake Pirates: 2006–2010
Southern Oregon RiverDawgs: 2005 (replaced by the Medford Rogues in 2013)
Spokane RiverHawks: 2005–2009

History

2005–2009

In 2005 the teams played 42 games. For the 2007 season, this was the first year that the WCL used divisions. They separated the league into two divisions, East and West, based on geographical location. The playoffs worked in an odd way. The top two teams in the standings at the end of the season would playoff a best 2 out of 3 in both divisions. Then, the winners of the sets would playoff in the championship series, also a best 2 out of 3. In 2009, the league expanded the schedule to 48 games, at the same time going to an unbalanced schedule. Since 2012, the West Coast League has scheduled 54 league games for each team (with games against non-league opponents not counted in standings).

2010

In 2010 the league added Longview/Kelso (Cowlitz), Washington for the 2010 season, along with Walla Walla, Washington, which in turn cause a balanced schedule. The Moses Lake Pirates ceased operations following the 2010 season. 

2011

In 2011 the league expanded to Klamath Falls, which in turn caused a 54-game unbalanced schedule. Also, in the Summer of 2011 the Wenatchee Applesox won the East Division Pennant, and the Walla Walla Sweets came in second and beat the Applesox in the Division Playoffs to go on to play the Corvallis Knights where they lost 2 games to 0. In the West Division the Corvallis Knights won the Pennant and the Bend Elks were 8 games behind them but lost 2–0 in the Divisional games. 

2012

In 2012, the Wenatchee AppleSox won the East Division after topping the Bellingham Bells in the first round of the playoffs. At the same time, in the West Division the Corvallis Knights defeated the Cowlitz Black Bears. In the league's championship series, the AppleSox beat the Knights and captured their fifth league title.

2013

In the 2013 season the league changed from an East/West division format to a North/South division format because of further league expansion, of the Victoria HarbourCats, and the Medford Rogues, which brought the number of teams to 11. Also, in 2013 records were set and matched. Walla Walla Sweets pitcher Sean-Luke Brija matched the league record in saves, with 13 outstanding saves in the 2013 season. It was the first year an expansion team, in their first year, made the playoffs. The Medford Rogues made the playoffs by a tie, and winning their last 3 regular season games but, they lost their Cinderella Story season to the Corvallis Knights, beating them 2 games to nothing in the South Division playoffs. Also, the other expansion team, the Canadian Victoria HarbourCats, set a single game and All-star game attendance record of 4,210 in viewing. Finally, history was made in Kitsap after the last out of the top of the ninth when Spenser Watkins threw a spectacular perfect game, the first in West Coast League history.

2014

In 2014 the Yakima Valley Pippins came on board, giving the WCL their twelfth team. Future major leaguer Eli Morgan was 8-0 for them. Also, in the 2014 year, because of the expansion of Yakima, the WCL restructured their league format for the 4th time in its history, moving to a 3-division format, with East, West, and South Divisions. The playoff format adopted was similar to the MLB format, with only one wild card instead of two. The teams are shown in their respective geographical division in the Team Table below.

The play-off race came down to the last 2 days of league play with a race between Bend and Wenatchee for the first WCL Wild-card spot. Bend edged Wenatchee by just 1 game, causing Wenatchee to miss the playoffs for the first time. Yakima, Bellingham, and Corvallis won their divisions and set the field for the first three-division WCL playoff. The first round playoff pairings were Bellingham vs. Yakima and Corvallis vs. Bend. Both Corvallis and Bellingham won their first 2 games and advanced to the WCL Championship series. Bellingham won both games 2 and 3 of the series, making them the 4th team to ever win the WCL Championship.

2015

In 2015, the West Coast League saw its fifth league champion, the Bend Elks. Kelowna, Bellingham, Bend, and Corvallis advanced to the playoffs, in which Bend swept both Corvallis and Kelowna to capture their first WCL championship.

2016

In the 2015–2016 off-season, the Medford Rogues left the WCL and joined the Great West League. Also, the league announced that the Klamath Falls team would leave the league, with its place taken by a new team based in Gresham, Oregon. On December 4, 2015, the Gresham Baseball Club announced that the team would be named the Gresham GreyWolves.

In 2016, the Victoria HarbourCats set a single-season record for wins with 40, breaking the previous record of 39 (2011 Wenatchee AppleSox). Victoria also broke all three attendance records by having the highest attendance in a single game, season total, and game average. They had 60,466 total fans through the gates, averaging 2,239 a night, with a record 5,133 in one game on June 30 against the Kelowna Falcons.

In the new split-season playoffs format, Victoria won the first half in the North with a 19-game winning streak, and tied Bellingham for the second-half lead, with the Bells holding the tiebreaker by virtue of winning the season series. In the South, the first half was won by the Corvallis Knights, while the second half was won by the Yakima Valley Pippins. Both Corvallis and Bellingham swept their first-round playoff series, setting up a rematch of 2014's WCL Championship Series. The 2016 edition saw Corvallis win a thrilling Game 3 and capture their fourth championship.

2020

The West Coast League canceled its 2020 summer collegiate season due to the COVID-19 pandemic.

2021

The five Canadian teams in the West Coast League will not play the 2021 season due to pandemic-related border and gathering limitations. They plan to play in 2022, which will be the inaugural season for Edmonton, Kamloops, and Nanaimo.

2022

On September 19, 2022, the West Coast League announced a partnership with Major League Baseball as a part of the growing list of larger collegiate leagues partnering with MLB to further grow collegiate summer wood bat baseball. The agreement was reached to jointly pursue initiatives of mutual interest, including player and coach development, technology innovation related to scouting and fan experience, and community engagement.

Records by season

Individual batting records

Team batting records

Individual pitching records

Team pitching records

Team fielding records

Team attendance records

Champions

Awards

Most Valuable Player

Pitcher of the Year

Coach of the Year

Executive of the Year

Jim Dietz Sportsmanship Award

Established in 2008, and named after the West Coast League's inaugural commissioner Jim Dietz.

Pennant winners

Before 2007 there was only 1 division.

In 2013 the league moved from an East/West format to a North/South Division format.

In 2014 the League moved to a 3-division format.

In 2016 the League went to a 2 division split-season style format.

References

External links
 Official website

Summer baseball leagues
Baseball in Washington (state)
Baseball leagues in Canada
Baseball in Oregon
College baseball leagues in the United States
Sports leagues established in 2005
2005 establishments in British Columbia
2005 establishments in Oregon
2005 establishments in Washington (state)